Simon J. Payne (born 27 August 1964) is a Bermudian luger. He competed at the 1992 Winter Olympics and the 1994 Winter Olympics. He was the first person to represent Bermuda at the Winter Olympics, and later founded the Bermuda Luge Federation.

References

External links
 

1964 births
Living people
Bermudian male lugers
Olympic lugers of Bermuda
Lugers at the 1992 Winter Olympics
Lugers at the 1994 Winter Olympics
People from Hamilton, Bermuda